The 2nd Panzer Army was a German armoured formation during World War II, formed from the 2nd Panzer Group on October 5, 1941.

Organisation
Panzer Group Guderian was formed on 5 June 1940 and named after its commander, general Heinz Guderian. In early June 1940, after reaching the English Channel following the breakthrough in the Ardennes, the Panzergruppe Guderian was formed from the XIX Army Corps, and thrust deep into France, cutting off the Maginot Line. In November 1940, it was upgraded into Panzergruppe 2.

The 2nd Panzer Group was formed in November 1940 from Panzer Group Guderian. In October 1941 it was renamed the 2nd Panzer Army. Panzer Group 2 played a significant role in the early stages of the German invasion of the Soviet Union during Operation Barbarossa in 1941 when it was a constituent part of Army Group Centre.

Operational history
2nd Panzer Group was part of the Army Group Centre during Operation Barbarossa, the invasion of the Soviet Union. Guderian's 2nd Panzer Army formed the Army Group's southern pincer while Hoth's 3rd Panzer Army formed the northern pincer destroying several Soviet armies during the opening phase of Operation Barbarossa. During the battles of Bialystok and Minsk substantial numbers of prisoners were captured and several weapons captured.

Suffering heavy losses in men and equipment, the German forces advanced deeper into the Soviet Union. The rasputitsa season (literally "roadlessness", due to heavy rains and sluggish muddy roads) began to slow down the formation's progress to a few kilometres a day. The rasputitsa was not an unusual phenomenon, but the Wehrmacht did not prepare for this contingency as the German high command had expected the German army to be in Moscow and beyond at this time, with the campaign over before the end of summer. After Minsk, the 2nd and 3rd Panzer Armies captured Smolensk in another successful pincer operation taking around 300,000 prisoners.

Hitler ordered Army Group Center to detach the 2nd Panzer Group, turning southward towards Kyiv to form the northern pincer at Kyiv. Guderian's 2nd Panzer Army and Kleist's 1st Panzer Army were locked in a pincer around Kyiv to trap 665,000 Soviet prisoners. After concluding the Kyiv encirclement, the German planned for the three Panzer armies to attack Moscow from different directions:  

4th Panzer Army in the North around Leningrad would attack southward. Hoth's 3rd Panzer Army would attack eastward towards Moscow, while the 2nd Panzer Army would turn northwest and attack Moscow from the south. Guderian's forces tried to encircle the 50th Army, which was successfully defending Tula. After unsuccessful attempts to capture Tula, the high command ordered Gudarian to bypass Tula on November 18 and head towards the vital town of Kashira. The furthest attack was stopped near Kashira by the 1st Guards Cavalry Corps, 173rd Rifle Division, and other units that withstood the central attack of the Guderian army.  

The Group's divisions had suffered heavy attrition since the beginning of the invasion and experienced shortages in fuel and ammunition due to the breakdown in logistics. By November, the situation of Guderian's Panzer Group was dire. Nonetheless, Guderian expected the Red Army's resistance to collapse and, driven by National Socialist military thinking, including the idea that the "will" was key to success, continued to direct his forces to attack. 

By early December, the final advance on Moscow failed in the face of stiffening Soviet resistance and due to shortages in men and equipment. Until the Soviet counter-offensive, the Germans enjoyed complete domination of the skies and numerical advantage in material and men power during the Battle of Moscow. The massive and unexpected counter-attacks of 1st Guards Cavalry Corps, 50th Army, 10th Army, and parts of 49th Army drove the Germans the furthest from the capital, thus resulting in Hitler's dismissal of Heinz Guderian. After the battle he would never again reach the height and the popularity with Hitler or command any significant part of the German forces.

In August 1943, the 2nd Panzer Army was transferred to occupied Yugoslavia, where it was incorporated into Army Group F and engaged in anti-partisan operations against the Chetniks under Draža Mihailović and the communist Yugoslav Partisans under Josip Broz Tito. Despite engaging in several operations aimed to crush the partisan movement, particularly the communists, no clear victory was gained. Indeed, the partisan movement grew in size and equipment, particularly after the fall of Italian Fascism in the 1943 coup of 25 Luglio led to the mass defection and surrender of Italian units stationed in occupied Bosnia and Montenegro.

Throughout 1943-44, the 2nd Panzer Army was progressively stripped of its heavy armor destined for the war on the Eastern Front, and became a primarily motorized infantry force. It did gain specialized Alpine support from units like the Brandenburgers and 7th SS Volunteer Mountain Division Prinz Eugen divisions. However, endemic guerilla warfare cost the 2nd Panzer Army heavily, and only months after the Raid on Drvar (Operation Rösselsprung) failed to assassinate the communist partisan leadership via airborne assault, the 2nd Panzer Army and all of Army Group F were pushed out of Belgrade in a joint operation by the Partisans and Red Army during the Belgrade Offensive. The 2nd Panzer Army finished the war in disarray in modern Austria.

War crimes
As all German armies on the Eastern Front, Panzer Group 2 implemented the criminal Commissar Order during Operation Barbarossa. In September 1942, the 2nd Panzer Army took part in war crimes while conducting anti-guerrilla operations in the Soviet Union. These operations killed at least a thousand people, razed entire villages, and deported over 18,500. During these operations, Jews and suspected partisans were murdered by being forced to drag ploughs through minefields.

In August 1943, the army's headquarters was subordinated to Army Group F and transferred to the Balkans for anti-partisan operations. The army became primarily an infantry formation at this point and found itself committed to anti-partisan operations, and personnel were accused postwar of multiple atrocities against civilians and partisans.

After the Belgrade Offensive overtook army headquarters, surviving units of the 2nd Panzer Army were subsequently transferred to Hungary as part of Army Group South in January 1945, holding off the Soviet invasion of Austria. 2nd Panzer Army took part in the Battle of the Transdanubian Hills in March 1945 before surrendering at the end of the war to both Soviet and Anglo-American forces.

Commanders

Order of battle
Organization of Panzer Group Guderian on 28 May 1940

June 22, 1941

July 27, 1941

September 30, 1941

November 30, 1943

Notes

Sources
 

P2
Military units and formations established in 1940
Military units and formations of Germany in Yugoslavia in World War II
Military units and formations disestablished in 1945